Simon Phipps is a British self-taught game programmer and video game designer. He began making games in 1982 when he wrote his first published video game he wrote while he was at school. He spent a few months writing business software before he was approached to provide some freelance artwork for Sheffield-based Gremlin Graphics. At his interview, he was offered a full-time position.

In 1988, he was one of the founders of Core Design, where he would work on many of their titles until leaving in 1996.

Phipps then worked on Acclaim Entertainment's hit Shadow Man, alongside game designer Guy Miller. Phipps worked for Acclaim Teesside, but about 9 months into making the game ShadowMan: 2econd Coming, he left for Electronic Arts (EA) where he worked alongside Guy Miller on the Harry Potter games for five years.

In 2006, he moved to EA's studio Criterion Games working on a number of unpublished titles as well as contributing to their website and video podcast. In early 2009 he left EA and joined Eurocom.

Games
 Jet Power Jack
 Masters of the Universe: the Movie
 Skate Crazy
 Night Raider
 Rick Dangerous
 Switchblade
 Saint and Greavsie's Football Trivia
 Monty Python's Flying Circus
 Rick Dangerous 2
 Thunderhawk
 Wolfchild
 Asterix and the Power of the Gods
 Bubba 'n' Stix
 Shellshock
 College Slam
 ShadowMan
 ShadowMan: 2econd Coming
 Harry Potter and the Philosopher's Stone
 Harry Potter and the Chamber of Secrets
 Harry Potter and the Prisoner of Azkaban
 Harry Potter and the Goblet of Fire
 Harry Potter and the Order of the Phoenix

References

External links 
 Phipps' Webpage
 

1966 births
Living people
Video game designers
Video game programmers